Nanisivik Mine was a zinc-lead mine in the company town of Nanisivik, Nunavut,  north of the Arctic Circle on Baffin Island. It was Canada's first mine in the Arctic.
The mine first opened on 15 October 1976 and permanently closed in September 2002 due to low metal prices and declining resources. Mine reclamation began in April 2003.
It was one of the most northerly mines in the world.

It was used for shipping concentrate from the site, and receiving supplies. It is currently used by the Canadian Coast Guard for training and is intended to become Nanisivik Naval Facility.

Climate 
Nanisivik has a tundra climate (ET) with long, cold winters and very short, chilly summers that are rarely mild. Early winter tends to be snowiest period of the year, with around 40% of all yearly snowfall falling during this short period.

See also

Polaris mine
El Toqui mine
El Mochito mine

References

Mines in Nunavut
Lead mines in Canada
Zinc mines in Canada
Baffin Island
Former mines in Canada
Former populated places in the Qikiqtaaluk Region